Kelly Erez is an English R&B and soul singer-songwriter and vocal coach.

Biography
Kelly was born and grew up in Stratford, East London. She has been interested in music since an early age and her biggest influence was the 90s R&B, particularly such artists as Mariah Carey and Boyz II Men. She began sharing her music on YouTube in 2010 and went on to release an EP This Is Me... in early 2011, which she sponsored by raising funds on PledgeMusic. The EP was promoted by the song "Letters" which was popular on YouTube and received media coverage in Poland. Still in 2011, Kelly played her first live concerts, including a show at Hoxton Hall. October 2012 saw the release of her debut studio album, Come to Me, produced by her sister Natalie Erez. The title song was picked by BBC Radio 1Xtra as Track of the Week and received airplay across the BBC network. The music video for the song followed in January 2013. In May 2013, Erez released a double A-side single with songs "Xtra" and "Money Money" which was well received on urban radio in the UK. In 2015, Kelly contributed vocals to the song "Distraction" by Cardboard Foxes.

Her second EP, Clear My Name, was self-released in September 2018, promoted by the title song. In May 2021, Erez appeared on the BBC game show I Can See Your Voice. Around the same time, she also released a remix EP, promoted by a new single and music video "Run the Water". Her latest single, "Time Out", was released in January 2022.

Discography

Studio albums

EPs

Singles

References

External links
 Official website
 Official channel on YouTube

British contemporary R&B singers
British women singer-songwriters
Date of birth unknown
English soul singers
Living people
People from Stratford, London
Singers from London
Year of birth missing (living people)